Bevard is a surname. Notable people with the surname include:
 Herbert Bevard (born 1946), American bishop
 Samuel S. Bevard (died 1940), American politician

See also
 Bevard House